The 2011 season was the Denver Broncos' 42nd in the National Football League (NFL) and their 52nd overall. It also marked their first season under head coach John Fox, as well as the first with John Elway as the team's Executive Vice President of Football Operations.

On July 25, the NFLPA and NFL owners agreed on a new collective bargaining agreement, which was ratified on August 4. The Broncos training camp began on July 28 at the team headquarters in Dove Valley, Colorado, and the preseason and regular season started on time.

This was the first of five consecutive AFC West titles for the Broncos. The first five weeks of the season were dominated by a quarterback controversy involving Kyle Orton and Tim Tebow, with fans voicing their displeasure with the play of Orton, which resulted in a 1–4 start, and the public outcry for Tebow to be moved to starter. On October 11, Tebow was named the starting quarterback beginning with the team's Week 7 game at the Miami Dolphins on October 23. Tebow compiled an 8–5 record (including the playoffs, with a six-game win streak from Weeks 9–14) after replacing Orton, including game-winning drives in the fourth quarter and/or overtime in six of those games, despite constant criticism of his unorthodox mechanics and abilities as a passer. Orton was later waived on November 22. Another notable roster change was the trade that sent wide receiver Brandon Lloyd to the St. Louis Rams in exchange for a conditional 2012 draft selection.

The Broncos doubled their win total from 2010, finishing in a three-way tie with the Oakland Raiders and San Diego Chargers for the AFC West division title, with an 8–8 record. The Broncos, however, won the AFC West based on tiebreakers, thus clinching their first playoff berth and division title since 2005.

The Broncos opened the playoffs with a 29–23 overtime win over the Pittsburgh Steelers in the Wild Card round, but were blown out by the New England Patriots in the Divisional round by a score of 45–10.

Coaching and front-office changes
 January 5: Hall of Fame quarterback John Elway was hired as the team's Executive Vice President of Football Operations. Brian Xanders remained as general manager, but Elway had the final word in all football matters. Joe Ellis, who served as the team's chief operating officer for the past three years, was promoted to team president.
 January 13: The Broncos named former Carolina Panthers' head coach John Fox as the team's new head coach.
 January 17: The following changes were made to the Broncos' coaching staff: Clancy Barone was moved from offensive line coach to tight ends coach, replacing Bob Ligashesky. Dave Magazu was named the new offensive line coach. Tyke Tolbert was named the new wide receivers coach. Magazu and Tolbert both previously served on John Fox's staff with the Panthers. Brian Callahan was moved to the offensive quality control position, while Jay Rodgers was moved to the defensive quality control position. Eric Studesville, who served as the team's interim head coach for the final four games of the 2010 season, retained his position as the running backs coach.
 January 20: Adam Gase, who served as the Broncos' wide receivers coach during the previous two seasons, was named the team's new quarterbacks coach, replacing Ben McDaniels. That same day, Jeff Rodgers, who served on John Fox's staff with the Panthers during the previous two seasons, was named the team's new special teams coach.
 January 24: The Broncos hired former New Orleans Saints' secondary coach Dennis Allen as the team's new defensive coordinator, replacing Don Martindale.
 January 25: Ron Milus was hired as the new secondary coach, replacing Dennis Allen, while Richard Smith was hired as the new linebackers coach. Milus previously served as the Broncos' secondary coach in 2000, while Smith previously served as the Broncos' special teams coach and linebackers coach in the mid-1990s, and both previously served on John Fox's staff with the Panthers during the past two seasons.
 January 27: The coaching staff was finalized, when Keith Burns was brought back as the assistant special teams coach and Sam Garnes was hired as the teams' new assistant secondary coach. Garnes served on John Fox's staff with the Panthers last season.
 July 22: The Broncos hired Jerry Butler as the team's director of player development. Butler previously served in the same capacity with the Cleveland Browns from 2001 to 2010, and was a wide receiver with the Buffalo Bills from 1979 to 1986.

Pre-lockout roster changes
The Broncos made the following roster moves prior to the decertification of the NFLPA on March 11 and subsequent 2011 NFL Lockout:

 On January 7, five days after the end of the 2010 season, the team signed fullback Mike McLaughlin, guards Shawn Murphy and Manny Ramirez and offensive tackle Herb Taylor to future contracts. McLaughlin was waived on July 29, Murphy was waived on August 29 and Taylor was waived on September 6.
 On February 22, unrestricted free agent cornerback Champ Bailey was re-signed.
 On March 2, tight end Daniel Graham was released.
 On March 3, unrestricted free agent defensive tackle Kevin Vickerson was re-signed, while defensive tackles Justin Bannan and Jamal Williams were released.

Draft

Despite the 2011 NFL Lockout, the 2011 NFL draft was held from April 28–30. However, no undrafted free agents were signed until after the lockout ended on July 25.

Draft trades

Post-lockout roster changes

Free agents
The following free agents were left unsigned after the beginning of the 2011 NFL Lockout in March (cornerback Champ Bailey and defensive tackle Kevin Vickerson were re-signed before the lockout):

Undrafted free agents
All undrafted free agents were signed on July 27, two days after the end of the 2011 NFL Lockout.

Signings

Departures

Trades
 July 27: Wide receiver Jabar Gaffney was traded to the Washington Redskins in exchange for defensive end Jeremy Jarmon. Jarmon was later waived on September 4.
 August 1: The Broncos acquired defensive tackle Brodrick Bunkley from the Philadelphia Eagles in exchange for an undisclosed 2013 draft selection.
 October 17: Wide receiver Brandon Lloyd was traded to the St. Louis Rams in exchange for a sixth-round selection in the 2012 NFL draft; the selection was later upgraded to a fifth-rounder after a condition was met in which Lloyd made a minimum of 30 receptions with the Rams.

Injuries
 July 27: Wide receiver Demaryius Thomas was placed on the non-football injury list. Thomas suffered a ruptured Achilles tendon shortly after the end of the  season, and had surgery back in February. Thomas later suffered a broken finger during practice on September 8, and missed the first six weeks of the regular season.
 August 15: Defensive tackles Marcus Thomas and Ty Warren each sustained separate injuries in practice. Thomas suffered a strained pectoral muscle, and missed the first four weeks of the regular season. Warren suffered torn triceps, and was initially expected to return in November, but was placed on the season-ending injured reserve on September 17.
 August 27: Linebacker D. J. Williams suffered a dislocated elbow during the team's third preseason game vs. the Seattle Seahawks, and missed the first three weeks of the regular season.
 September 2: Cornerback Syd'Quan Thompson suffered a ruptured Achilles tendon during the team's last preseason game at the Arizona Cardinals, and missed the entire 2011 season.
 October 10: Defensive tackle Kevin Vickerson was placed on injured reserve, after suffering an ankle injury during the team's Week 5 loss to the San Diego Chargers the previous day.
 November 14: Running back Knowshon Moreno was placed on injured reserve, after he suffered a torn ACL in his right knee during the team's Week 10 win over the Kansas City Chiefs the previous day.
 November 28: Cornerback/return specialist Cassius Vaughn was placed on injured reserve, after suffering a broken bone in his leg during the team's Week 12 win over the San Diego Chargers the previous day.
 January 2, 2012: Guard Chris Kuper was placed on injured reserve, after suffering a broken leg during the team's regular season finale against the Kansas City Chiefs the previous day.
 January 10, 2012: Fullback Spencer Larsen was placed on injured reserve.

Staff

Final roster

Preseason

Regular season

Schedule

Note: Intra-division opponents are in bold text.

Game summaries

Week 1: vs. Oakland Raiders

The Broncos donned their alternate orange jerseys and kicked off their  season at home against their AFC West rival Oakland Raiders, the Broncos' first Week 1 home opener since 2004. The Broncos took an early lead in the first quarter, with a 28-yard field goal by placekicker Matt Prater. The Raiders reeled off 16 unanswered points in the second quarter, with a 3-yard touchdown pass from quarterback Jason Campbell to fullback Marcel Reece, followed by three field goals of 37, 21 and 63 yards by placekicker Sebastian Janikowski, the latter of which tied the record for the longest field goal in NFL history. The Broncos responded in the third quarter, with kick returner Eric Decker returning a punt 90 yards for a touchdown, followed by a 30-yard field goal by Prater. The Raiders increased their lead in the fourth quarter, with a 1-yard touchdown run by Campbell. The Broncos tried to rally, with quarterback Kyle Orton throwing a 9-yard touchdown pass to running back Lance Ball. However, Oakland ran out the clock.

This would be the last time the Broncos lost their season opener and home opener until 2019; their opener that year was also against the Raiders.

Week 2: vs. Cincinnati Bengals

Following their Monday Night loss to the Raiders, the Broncos remained on home turf to face the Cincinnati Bengals. The Broncos took the lead in the first quarter, with a 1-yard touchdown run by running back Willis McGahee. The Bengals got on the board in the second quarter, with a 45-yard field goal by placekicker Mike Nugent. The Broncos responded, with a 34-yard field goal by placekicker Matt Prater just before halftime. In the third quarter, the Broncos extended their lead, with a 25-yard touchdown pass from quarterback Kyle Orton to wide receiver Eric Decker. The Bengals reeled off 12 unanswered points, with a 37-yard field goal by Nugent, a 10-yard touchdown pass from quarterback Andy Dalton to wide receiver Andre Caldwell (with a failed two-point conversion attempt), followed by a 23-yard field goal by Nugent, narrowing the Broncos' lead to 17–15. In the fourth quarter, the Broncos once again increased their lead, with a 52-yard touchdown pass from Orton to Decker, but the Bengals responded, with a 5-yard touchdown pass from Dalton to wide receiver A. J. Green. The Broncos' defense prevented any more scoring.

Week 3: at Tennessee Titans

Following their close win over the Bengals, the Broncos traveled to Nashville to face the Tennessee Titans at LP Field. The Broncos took the lead in the first quarter, with a 5-yard touchdown pass from quarterback Kyle Orton to wide receiver Matthew Willis. The Titans responded in the second quarter, with a 14-yard touchdown pass from quarterback Matt Hasselbeck to wide receiver Nate Washington, followed by a 46-yard field goal by placekicker Rob Bironas. The Broncos re-claimed the lead in the third quarter, when Orton connecting with running back Willis McGahee on a 5-yard touchdown pass. However, after recovering a Hasselbeck fumble in Titans' territory late in the third quarter, the Broncos failed to capitalize on the turnover, as Tennessee's defense denied the Broncos from extending their lead with a goal-line stand in the fourth quarter. The Titans later claimed the lead, when Hasselbeck, playing on his 36th birthday, threw a 4-yard touchdown pass to tight end Daniel Graham, who played with the Broncos from 2007 to 2010. Tennessee's defense thwarted the Broncos' final drive.

Week 4: at Green Bay Packers

Hoping to avenge their loss at Tennessee, the Broncos traveled to Lambeau Field to face the defending Super Bowl champion Green Bay Packers. The Broncos took the early lead, with a 27-yard field goal by placekicker Matt Prater. However, the Packers responded, with a 50-yard touchdown pass from quarterback Aaron Rodgers to wide receiver Jordy Nelson, followed by cornerback Charles Woodson returning an interception off Broncos' quarterback Kyle Orton 30 yards for a touchdown. After recovering an onside kick, the Packers added to their lead early in the second quarter, with Rodgers scrambling 11 yards for a touchdown. The Broncos responded, with Orton throwing two touchdown passes to wide receiver Eric Decker: a 5-yarder, followed by a 33-yarder. The Packers responded just before halftime, when Rodgers connected on a 17-yard touchdown pass to wide receiver Greg Jennings. The Packers increased their lead on the opening possession of the third quarter, with Rodgers scrambling for an 8-yard touchdown run, followed by a 16-yard touchdown pass from Rodgers to wide receiver James Jones. The Packers continued their onslaught in the fourth quarter, with Rodgers hooking up with wide receiver Donald Driver on an 8-yard touchdown pass. The Broncos scored a late touchdown, when Orton connected with tight end Daniel Fells on a 7-yard touchdown pass (with a failed two-point conversion attempt), but the outcome of the game had already been decided in Green Bay's favor. The loss drops the Broncos to 0–4–1 all-time in Green Bay.

Week 5: vs. San Diego Chargers

Hoping to rebound from their blowout loss at Green Bay, the Broncos returned home for an AFC West duel with the San Diego Chargers. The Chargers took the early lead in the first quarter, with a 24-yard field goal by placekicker Nick Novak. The Broncos grabbed the lead, when cornerback Cassius Vaughn returned an interception off Chargers' quarterback Philip Rivers 55 yards for a touchdown. The Chargers responded, with a 32-yard field goal by Novak. The Broncos extended their lead in the second quarter, with a 32-yard field goal by placekicker Matt Prater. However, the Chargers reclaimed the lead, with a 2-yard touchdown run by Rivers, a 28-yard field goal by Novak, followed by a 42-yard touchdown pass from Rivers to wide receiver Malcom Floyd, giving San Diego a 23–10 halftime lead. The Broncos benched quarterback Kyle Orton in favor of Tim Tebow. After a scoreless third quarter, the Chargers added to their lead, with a 51-yard field goal by Novak. The Broncos responded, when Tebow scrambled for a 12-yard touchdown (with a two-point conversion run by running back Willis McGahee), then threw a 28-yard touchdown pass to running back Knowshon Moreno (with a failed two-point conversion attempt), to pull the Broncos to within 26–24 with just over three minutes left in the game. The Chargers responded, with a 35-yard field goal by Novak. The Broncos tried to rally with 24 seconds remaining in regulation, but Tebow's last-second desperation pass into the end zone was unsuccessful, sealing the win for San Diego.

Injuries

Defensive tackle Kevin Vickerson suffering an ankle injury early in the game. Though he later returned, he was placed on injured reserve one day later (October 10).

Week 7: at Miami Dolphins

Hoping to snap their three-game losing streak, and coming off their bye week, the Broncos traveled to face the Miami Dolphins in Sun Life Stadium, where the Broncos had never won in their franchise history except against another team, the Atlanta Falcons in Super Bowl XXXIII. After a scoreless first quarter, the Dolphins grabbed the lead in the second quarter, with field goals of 38 and 36 yards by kicker Dan Carpenter. After a scoreless third quarter, the Dolphins extended their lead in the fourth quarter, with quarterback Matt Moore throwing a 16-yard touchdown pass to tight end Anthony Fasano (with a failed two-point conversion attempt), followed by a 43-yard field goal by Carpenter, giving Miami a 15–0 lead. However, after each team traded punts, the Broncos staged a rally with just over five minutes remaining, with quarterback Tim Tebow throwing a 5-yard touchdown pass to wide receiver Demaryius Thomas to pull to within 15–7 with 2:44 remaining. After the Broncos recovered an onside kick, they subsequently marched down the field, with Tebow connecting on a 3-yard touchdown pass to tight end Daniel Fells, followed by Tebow scrambling for the two-point conversion to send the game into overtime. On the Dolphins' second possession in overtime, Broncos' linebacker D. J. Williams forced a fumble off Moore, giving the Broncos possession at the Dolphins' 36-yard line. Four plays later, kicker Matt Prater, who had missed two field goals in the first half, nailed the game-winning 52-yard field goal.

Notes

With the win, the Broncos earned their 400th win in franchise history, their first-ever win over the Dolphins at Miami in eight tries, and became the first team in NFL history since the AFL–NFL merger to win a game after trailing by 15 or more points with less than three minutes remaining in the fourth quarter.

Week 8: vs. Detroit Lions

Hoping to build on the momentum of their comeback win at Miami, the Broncos donned their alternate orange jerseys and returned home for an interconference duel with the Detroit Lions. The Broncos grabbed the early lead in the first quarter, with a 39-yard field goal by placekicker Matt Prater. However, the Lions dominated the remainder of the game, beginning with a 41-yard touchdown pass from quarterback Matthew Stafford to wide receiver Titus Young, followed in the second quarter by a 50-yard field goal by placekicker Jason Hanson, a 1-yard touchdown pass from Stafford to tight end Tony Scheffler and a 1-yard touchdown run from running back Maurice Morris, giving Detroit a 24–3 halftime lead. The Lions continued their domination in the third quarter, with a 24-yard fumble return for a touchdown by defensive end Cliff Avril, a 56-yard touchdown pass from Stafford to wide receiver Calvin Johnson, followed in the fourth quarter by cornerback Chris Houston returning an interception off Broncos' quarterback Tim Tebow 100 yards for a touchdown. The Broncos finally got into the end zone, with Tebow throwing a 14-yard touchdown pass to wide receiver Eric Decker, but the outcome of the game had already been decided in Detroit's favor.

Week 9: at Oakland Raiders

Hoping to rebound from their disastrous home loss to the Lions, the Broncos traveled to the O.co Coliseum for an AFC West rematch with the Oakland Raiders. In the first quarter, the Raiders grabbed the early lead, with a 48-yard field goal by placekicker Sebastian Janikowski. The Broncos responded, with quarterback Tim Tebow hooking up with wide receiver Eric Decker on a 27-yard touchdown pass. The Raiders re-claimed the lead in the second quarter, with quarterback Carson Palmer throwing two touchdown passes: an 11-yarder to running back Michael Bush, followed by a 40-yarder to fullback Marcel Reece. In the third quarter, the Broncos cut into the Raiders' lead, with a 26-yard touchdown pass from Tebow to wide receiver Eddie Royal. The Raiders responded, with Palmer throwing an 18-yard touchdown pass to wide receiver Jacoby Ford, giving Oakland a 24–14 lead. However, the Broncos dominated the remainder of the game, beginning with a 43-yard field goal by placekicker Matt Prater, followed by running back Willis McGahee rushing for a 60-yard touchdown at the end of the third quarter. The Broncos grabbed the lead with six minutes remaining in the fourth quarter, when Royal returned a punt 85 yards for a touchdown, then pulled away with a 24-yard touchdown run by McGahee.

Week 10: at Kansas City Chiefs

Coming off their win at Oakland, the Broncos traveled to Arrowhead Stadium for an AFC West duel with the Kansas City Chiefs. In the first quarter, the Broncos grabbed the early lead, with quarterback Tim Tebow scrambling for a 7-yard touchdown, followed in the second quarter by a 38-yard field goal by placekicker Matt Prater. The Chiefs got on the board in the third quarter, with a 1-yard touchdown pass from quarterback Matt Cassel to fullback Le'Ron McClain. The Broncos responded in the fourth quarter, with Tebow throwing a 56-yard touchdown pass to wide receiver Eric Decker. The Chiefs tried to rally, with placekicker Ryan Succop nailing a late 32-yard field goal with seven seconds remaining, but the ensuing onside kickoff was unsuccessful, sealing the win for the Broncos.

Notes

With the win, the Broncos matched their win total from 2010.

Injuries

Running back Knowshon Moreno suffered a torn ACL in his right knee during the first quarter, and was placed on injured reserve.

Week 11: vs. New York Jets

Coming off their win at Kansas City, the Broncos returned home for an AFC duel against the New York Jets on Thursday Night Football. The Broncos grabbed the lead in the first quarter, with a 37-yard field goal by placekicker Matt Prater. The Jets tied the game in the second quarter, with a 21-yard field goal by placekicker Nick Folk, then grabbed the lead in the third quarter, when guard Matt Slauson returned a fumble off Jets' running back Bilal Powell into the end zone for a touchdown. The Broncos tied the game, when cornerback André Goodman returned an interception off Jets' quarterback Mark Sanchez 26 yards for a touchdown. The Jets re-claimed the lead in the fourth quarter, with a 45-yard field goal by Folk. After each team traded punts, the Broncos got the ball with 5:54 remaining, when quarterback Tim Tebow led the Broncos on a 12-play, 95-yard drive, culminating with Tebow scrambling 20 yards for a touchdown with 58 seconds remaining. The Broncos' defense thwarted Sanchez' last-second desperation pass toward the end zone.

Notes

With the win, the Broncos exceeded their win total from 2010.

Week 12: at San Diego Chargers

Coming off their win over the Jets, the Broncos traveled to Qualcomm Stadium for an AFC West rematch with the San Diego Chargers. The Chargers jumped out to a 10–0 lead, with a 53-yard field goal by kicker Nick Novak in the first quarter, followed in the second quarter by a 6-yard touchdown pass from quarterback Philip Rivers to tight end Antonio Gates. The Broncos responded just before halftime, with an 18-yard touchdown pass from quarterback Tim Tebow to wide receiver Eric Decker. The Chargers added to their lead in the third quarter, with a 25-yard field goal by Novak. The Broncos countered just before the end of the third quarter, with a 41-yard field goal by kicker Matt Prater. Novak missed a 48-yard field goal early in the fourth quarter. Trailing 13–10 with just over five minutes remaining in the fourth quarter, the Broncos marched down the field and tied the game with a 24-yard field goal by Prater. The Broncos' defense subdued San Diego's final drive of the fourth quarter, sending the game to overtime. On the Chargers' second possession in overtime, Novak's potential game-winning 53-yard field goal was blocked. However, head coach John Fox had called a timeout prior to the kick. Novak missed the second attempt wide right. The Broncos' third possession in overtime began with 2:31 remaining, and Prater nailed the game-winning 37-yard field goal with 29 seconds left in overtime.

Notes

With the win, the Broncos swept their AFC West division rivals on the road for the second time in three seasons.

Injuries

Cornerback Cassius Vaughn suffered a broken bone in his leg, and was placed on injured reserve the following day.

Week 13: at Minnesota Vikings

Coming off their overtime win at San Diego, the Broncos traveled to the Mall of America Field at the Hubert H. Humphrey Metrodome for an interconference duel with the Minnesota Vikings. The game's first points came from the Vikings, when defensive end Jared Allen tackled running back Willis McGahee in the end zone for a safety. The Broncos grabbed the lead when linebacker Mario Haggan returned an interception off Vikings' quarterback Christian Ponder 16 yards for a touchdown. Vikings' kicker Ryan Longwell made a 40-yard field goal, then the Vikings reclaimed the lead in the second quarter, on a 19-yard touchdown pass from Ponder to tight end Kyle Rudolph, followed by another field goal by Longwell, this time from 25 yards, just before halftime. The Broncos narrowed Minnesota's lead in the third quarter, with a 21-yard touchdown pass from quarterback Tim Tebow to wide receiver Demaryius Thomas, but the Vikings countered with a 52-yard touchdown pass from Ponder to wide receiver Percy Harvin. The Broncos responded with a 41-yard touchdown pass from Tebow to Thomas. Ponder then threw a 48-yard touchdown pass to Harvin to give Minnesota a 29–21 lead. On the Broncos' next possession, McGahee rushed 24 yards for a touchdown and Tebow scrambled for a two-point conversion to tie the game at 29. The Vikings subsequently reclaimed the lead on Longwell's 39-yard field goal with 3:06 left in the game. The Broncos answered with kicker Matt Prater's 46-yard field goal with 1:33 left to tie the game at 32. On the Vikings' ensuing possession, Broncos' cornerback André Goodman returned an interception off Ponder to the Vikings' 15-yard line. Six plays later, Prater nailed the game-winning 23-yard field goal as time expired to give the Broncos their fifth consecutive win.

Week 14: vs. Chicago Bears

Coming off their last-second win at Minnesota, the Broncos returned home for an interconference duel with the Chicago Bears. After a scoreless first half, which included Bears' defensive end Julius Peppers blocking a 28-yard field goal attempt by kicker Matt Prater in the second quarter, the Bears grabbed the lead in the third quarter, with running back Marion Barber rushing for a 9-yard touchdown. The Bears extended their lead to 10–0 early in the fourth quarter, with a 57-yard field goal by kicker Robbie Gould. With 4:34 remaining in the fourth quarter, the Broncos put together a 7-play, 63-yard drive, and finally got on the scoreboard with 2:08 remaining, when quarterback Tim Tebow threw a 10-yard touchdown pass to wide receiver Demaryius Thomas. With no timeouts remaining, the Broncos tried an onside kick, but Chicago recovered prior to the two-minute warning. After one running play, the two-minute warning stopped the clock. On the next play, Broncos' linebacker D. J. Williams was able to push Barber out of bounds, saving 40 seconds of time. The Bears eventually punted to the Broncos' 20-yard line with 56 seconds remaining. Tebow subsequently led the Broncos on an 8-play, 39-yard drive, with Prater nailing a game-tying 59-yard field goal to send the game to overtime. This was the first game in NFL history that had two field goals of 57 yards or more. Chicago won the overtime coin toss, however, they deferred, and the Broncos went three-and-out on their first possession. The Bears drove into field goal range on their first overtime possession, but Broncos' linebacker Wesley Woodyard forced a fumble off Barber, with defensive end Elvis Dumervil recovering the fumble. Nine plays later, Prater nailed the game-winning 51-yard field goal.

Notes

In the fourth quarter and overtime, Tim Tebow was 18 of 24 with 191 yards passing and one touchdown. In his first 11 starts, Tebow has six game-winning drives in the fourth quarter or overtime.

Week 15: vs. New England Patriots

Coming off their overtime win over the Bears, the Broncos remained on home ground for an AFC duel with the New England Patriots. The Broncos grabbed the early lead, with quarterback Tim Tebow scrambling for a 9-yard touchdown (with a failed two-point conversion attempt after a botched extra-point snap). The Patriots responded, with quarterback Tom Brady throwing a 33-yard touchdown pass to wide receiver Chad Ochocinco. The Broncos countered, with a 32-yard touchdown run by running back Lance Ball, followed in the second quarter by a 26-yard field goal by kicker Matt Prater. However, New England reeled off 27 unanswered points, 17 of which came off three Broncos' turnovers in the second quarter. Brady connected with tight end Aaron Hernandez on a 1-yard touchdown pass, placekicker Stephen Gostkowski nailed a 21-yard field goal, Brady ran a 1-yard quarterback sneak for a touchdown and Gostkowski nailed a 34-yard field goal at the end of the first half. The Patriots added to their lead in the third quarter, with a 10-yard touchdown run by running back Danny Woodhead. The Broncos tried to cut into New England's lead in the fourth quarter, with Tebow scrambling for a 2-yard touchdown, but a 1-yard touchdown run by Patriots' running back BenJarvus Green-Ellis and a sack of Tebow for a loss of 28 yards put the game out of reach.

Week 16: at Buffalo Bills

Hoping to rebound from their loss to the Patriots, the Broncos traveled to Ralph Wilson Stadium for an AFC duel with the Buffalo Bills. The Broncos grabbed the early lead in the first quarter, with quarterback Tim Tebow scrambling for a 1-yard touchdown. The Bills stormed back, reeling off 17 unanswered points in the second quarter, with a 28-yard field goal by placekicker Dave Rayner, an 80-yard punt return for a touchdown by Leodis McKelvin and a 4-yard touchdown run by running back C. J. Spiller. The Broncos cut into Buffalo's lead early in the third quarter, with Tebow throwing a 17-yard touchdown pass to tight end Daniel Fells. However, the Broncos were held scoreless for the remainder of the game. The Bills added to their lead, with three field goals by Rayner—a pair of 25-yarders in the third quarter, followed by a 29-yarder early in the fourth quarter. The Bills pulled further away, converting two turnovers off Tebow into touchdowns—a 37-yard interception return by safety Jairus Byrd, followed by a 17-yard fumble return by linebacker Spencer Johnson.

Week 17: vs. Kansas City Chiefs

Hoping to rebound from their tough loss at Buffalo and keep their playoff hopes alive, the Broncos returned home for an AFC West rematch against the Kansas City Chiefs, in the team's regular season finale. This was Chiefs' quarterback Kyle Orton's first visit to Denver since he was waived by the Broncos on November 22. The Chiefs grabbed the early lead in the first quarter, with a 21-yard touchdown run by running back Dexter McCluster. After a scoreless second quarter, which included a fumble by Broncos' quarterback Tim Tebow deep in Chiefs' territory, the Broncos got on the scoreboard in the third quarter, with a 38-yard field goal by placekicker Matt Prater. However, both teams were held scoreless for the remainder of the game. Kansas City's defense thwarted the Broncos' last drive.

Notes

With the loss, the Broncos finished the regular season with an 8–8 record for the third time in four seasons, and were swept at home by their division rivals for the second time in three seasons. The Broncos finished tied with the Oakland Raiders and San Diego Chargers for the AFC West division title. However, the Broncos won the tiebreakers over both teams based on record against common opponents (5–5 to the Raiders' and Chargers' 4–6), thus clinching their first playoff berth and division title since 2005. This was the team's last loss to a division opponent until Week 15 of the 2013 season and last loss to the Chiefs until Week 10 of the 2015 season. 

Injuries
Guard Chris Kuper suffered a broken leg during the first quarter, and was placed on injured reserve the following day (January 2).

Standings

Postseason

Schedule

Game summaries

AFC Wild Card Playoffs: vs. (5) Pittsburgh Steelers

The Broncos opened the 2011–12 NFL Playoffs at home with a Wild Card matchup against the #5 seed Pittsburgh Steelers, the Broncos' first playoff game since 2005. The only points of the first quarter came from the Steelers, with field goals of 45 and 38 yards by placekicker Shaun Suisham. The Broncos reeled off 20 unanswered points in the second quarter, with quarterback Tim Tebow throwing a 30-yard touchdown pass to wide receiver Eddie Royal, then scrambling for an 8-yard touchdown run, followed by field goals of 20 and 28 yards by placekicker Matt Prater. A 1-yard touchdown run by Steelers' wide receiver Mike Wallace on an end-around was the only scoring play of the third quarter. The Broncos added to their lead early in the fourth quarter, with a 35-yard field goal by Prater. The Steelers countered with a 37-yard field goal by Suisham. On the Broncos' following possession, running back Willis McGahee fumbled, and the Steelers subsequently tied the game with a 7-play, 55-yard drive, culminating with a 31-yard touchdown pass from quarterback Ben Roethlisberger to wide receiver Jerricho Cotchery. Each team traded punts on subsequent possessions, sending the game to overtime. The Broncos won the overtime coin toss, and on their first play, Tebow fired the game-winning 80-yard touchdown pass to wide receiver Demaryius Thomas. It was not only the longest scoring play in NFL overtime playoff history, but Thomas also set a new Broncos' franchise record for receiving yards in a playoff game, with 204 yards.

With the win, the Broncos advanced to face the New England Patriots in the Divisional round.

AFC Divisional Playoffs: at (1) New England Patriots

Following their overtime win over the Steelers in the Wild Card round of the 2011–12 NFL Playoffs, the Broncos traveled to Foxborough, Massachusetts to face the #1 seed New England Patriots at Gillette Stadium, in the Divisional round. The Patriots jumped out to a 14–0 lead in the first quarter, with quarterback Tom Brady throwing a pair of touchdown passes—a 7-yarder to wide receiver Wes Welker and a 10-yarder to tight end Rob Gronkowski. The Broncos responded at the beginning of the second quarter, with running back Willis McGahee rushing for a 5-yard touchdown, but the Patriots subsequently added to lead, with Brady throwing three more touchdown passes—a 12-yarder to Gronkowski, a 61-yarder to wide receiver Deion Branch followed by a 19-yarder to Gronkowski just before halftime. The Patriots continued their onslaught in the third quarter, with a 17-yard touchdown pass to tight end Aaron Hernandez. A 41-yard field goal by Broncos' placekicker Matt Prater made the score 42–10. The Patriots added to their lead early in the fourth quarter, with a 20-yard field goal by placekicker Stephen Gostkowski, which was the last scoring play of the game by either team, sealing the win for New England.

Statistics

Team leaders

League rankings

Awards and honors

Other news and notes
 On August 16, Sports Authority, a sporting goods retailer based in Englewood, Colorado, took over the naming rights of INVESCO Field at Mile High. INVESCO Field at Mile High officially became known as Sports Authority Field at Mile High, in time for the Broncos' first preseason game against the Buffalo Bills on August 20.
 This season was the last in which the Broncos wore their navy blue jerseys as their primary home jersey. The team used the alternate orange jerseys for games in Weeks 1 (vs. the Oakland Raiders) and 8 (vs. the Detroit Lions). Beginning with the 2012 season, the Broncos announced that the orange jerseys – the team's alternate colored jersey since 2002 – will become the primary home jersey, while the navy blue jerseys, which had been the team's primary home jersey since their introduction in 1997, will switch to alternate designation. The change was made due to overwhelming popularity with fans, who clamored for the team to return to wearing orange at home, which was the team's predominant home jersey color from 1962 to 1996.

References

External links
 
 The Denver Post – Complete Broncos Coverage
 2011 Season page on Pro Football Reference
 2011 Denver Broncos at ESPN

Denver
Denver Broncos seasons
AFC West championship seasons
Denver Broncos